Joševa may refer to:
 Joševa (Bratunac), Bosnia and Herzegovina
 Joševa (Loznica), Serbia
 Joševa (Valjevo), Serbia